Gladys Amfobea (born 1 July 1998) is a Ghanaian international footballer who plays as a defender for the Ghana women's national football team. She competed for Ghana at the 2018 Africa Women Cup of Nations, playing in three matches and scoring one goal.

See also
List of Ghana women's international footballers

References

1998 births
Living people
Ghanaian women's footballers
Ghana women's international footballers
Women's association football defenders
Ghanaian expatriate women's footballers
Lady Strikers F.C. players
Thunder Queens F.C. players